Finola Hughes (born 29 October 1959) is an English dancer and actress, best known for her role as Anna Devane on the ABC soap operas General Hospital and All My Children, and her portrayal of Laura in the 1983 film Staying Alive, the sequel to Saturday Night Fever.

She is also known for her portrayal of Anna Devane's identical twin, Alexandra "Alex" Devane on All My Children and Patty Halliwell on the supernatural series, Charmed. She also portrayed Carol in the final seasons of the NBC sitcom Blossom. Hughes has also appeared in the films, Aspen Extreme, Above Suspicion and Like Crazy.

Career
Hughes trained in dance and performing arts at the Arts Educational Schools London. In 1981, she originated the role of Victoria the White Cat in the London production of Andrew Lloyd Webber's musical Cats. In 1983, Hughes starred with John Travolta in the musical film Staying Alive, a sequel to Saturday Night Fever. She played the role of Laura, an English dancer who is the romantic interest of Travolta's character Tony Manero. Hughes also appeared on the sitcom Blossom, and as the X-Men character Emma Frost in the television movie Generation X (1996).

In 1997, Hughes starred in Aaron Spelling's short-lived primetime soap opera Pacific Palisades. She was a frequent guest star on the television series Charmed, playing the mother of the Halliwell girls, Patricia "Patty" Halliwell. She provided the voice of Lara, Kal-El's biological mother in Superman: The Animated Series. Another voice-over role she had was Miss Robertson on an episode of Fox's animated comedy series Life with Louie.

From 1985 to 1992, she played Anna Devane on General Hospital. Hughes won a Daytime Emmy in 1991, for Outstanding Lead Actress on General Hospital. She was nominated for the same category in 1990 for Anna, in 2000 for All My Children as Alex, and, in 2002, as Anna. After establishing herself as a daytime television star, Hughes shot a feature film cameo as a soap opera actress who loses an award to Sally Field in the satirical film Soapdish (1991). Two years later, she played a leading role in the film Aspen Extreme (1993). It was announced in April 2006 that Hughes would be returning to GH. In May 2006, as part of the May Sweeps period, three GH veterans would return. Finola Hughes would be reunited with Tristan Rogers (Robert Scorpio) and Emma Samms (Holly Sutton). Following a rise in ratings from her sweeps return, Hughes returned to General Hospital for a limited run through August 2006. She returned the following year on 13 July 2007 and once again on 15 April 2008.

In September 2008, Hughes guest-starred in the General Hospital spinoff series General Hospital: Night Shift. It has been said that Hughes would return to GH in early 2012 as character Anna Devane to be with her daughter, Robin Scorpio, and help her through her toughest year. She is a recurring character but Anna Devane is front and center and staying in Port Charles awhile. In 2010, Finola also appeared in the CSI: NY, Make It or Break It and Melissa & Joey. Finola made a permanent return to General Hospital in 2012.

In 2013, Hughes made her feature-film directing debut with indie comedy-drama The Bet. She later starred with Kathryn McCormick in the dance movie Platinum the Dance Movie. In 2015, Hughes directed her second film, Byrd and the Bees a romantic comedy starring Jonathan Rhys Meyers and Tracy Spiridakos.

Personal life
Hughes was born in London. She married Russell Young in 1992. Their first child, son Dylan Joseph was born on November 9, 2000. Later, they adopted a son, Cash Justice Young born in 2005 and a daughter, Sadie Beatrice Young born in December 2007.

Filmography

Film

Television

Awards and nominations

See also
 List of dancers

References

External links

Official website (archived)

1959 births
Living people
Actresses from London
British identical twins
English expatriates in the United States
English stage actresses
English film actresses
English voice actresses
English television actresses
English soap opera actresses
Daytime Emmy Award winners
Daytime Emmy Award for Outstanding Lead Actress in a Drama Series winners
People educated at the Arts Educational Schools